The YG'z was an American East Coast hip hop group that recorded the EP Street Nigga in 1993.

Four out of the six songs on Street Nigga were produced by Pete Rock, who took the group under his wing and helped them get a record deal with Reprise/Warner Bros. Records, a sister label of Elektra Records within the WEA family, to which Pete Rock was signed.

The group was a featured guest on the song "Death Becomes You" by the hip-hop duo Pete Rock & C.L. Smooth on the Menace II Society original soundtrack.

Discography 
 Street Nigga (1993)

References 

American hip hop groups
Hip hop duos
Musical groups from New York (state)
Musicians from the New York metropolitan area
Pete Rock
Rappers from New York (state)
Reprise Records artists